Margot Foster (born 3 October 1958) is an Australian national representative and Olympic medal winning rower.

She stroked the coxed four to a bronze medal at the 1984 Summer Olympics. It was Australia's first Olympic medal in women's rowing.

Foster's father John competed for Australia in water polo at the 1952 and 1956 Summer Olympics, and her brother Peter won the bronze medal in the K-2 1000 m kayaking event at the 1988 Summer Olympics in Seoul.

In 2010, she was admitted to the Rowing Victoria Hall of Fame.

References 

 
 

1958 births
Living people
Australian female rowers
Rowers at the 1984 Summer Olympics
Olympic bronze medalists for Australia
Olympic medalists in rowing
Medalists at the 1984 Summer Olympics
Commonwealth Games medallists in rowing
Commonwealth Games gold medallists for Australia
Rowers at the 1986 Commonwealth Games
20th-century Australian women
Medallists at the 1986 Commonwealth Games